Ned Ashton may refer to:

 Ned Ashton (General Hospital), a fictional character in the American daytime drama General Hospital
 Ned Ashton, nickname for American engineer Edward L. Ashton, namesake for the 1947 Ned Ashton House in Iowa

See also
 Edward Ashton (disambiguation)